"Chinatown" is a song by American indie pop act Bleachers featuring American singer-songwriter Bruce Springsteen. The song was released alongside "45" on November 16, 2020, as the dual lead singles from Bleachers' third studio album Take the Sadness Out of Saturday Night, which was released on July 30, 2021. The act performed the song, along with "How Dare You Want More", in the January 15, 2022 episode of Saturday Night Live.

Critical reception
Jon Pareles writing for The New York Times praised Bruce Springsteen's guest appearance, saying "Springsteen’s voice appears as if out of a mist, like the apparition of a patron saint".

Music video
The song's official music video, directed by Carlotta Kohl, has been described as "nostalgic" and documents a man's journey from New York City to New Jersey, mirroring both singers' relationships to the state.

Track listing
7-inch vinyl
"Chinatown" (featuring Bruce Springsteen)' – 4:08
"45" – 3:45

Personnel
Credits taken from Tidal.

Jack Antonoff – lead vocals, songwriter, producer, acoustic guitar, bass, drum machine, keyboards
Bruce Springsteen – featured vocals
Patrik Berger – background vocals, producer, electric guitar, glockenspiel, synthesizer
Jacob Braun – cello
Chris Gehringer – mastering engineer
Serena McKinney Göransson – violin
Mikey Freedom Hart – electric guitar
Sean Hutchinson – percussion
Rob Lebert – assistant engineer
Laura Lisk – recording engineer
Will Quinnell – assistant engineer
Michael Riddleberger – percussion
John Rooney – assistant engineer
Jon Sher – assistant engineer
Mark "Spike" Stent – mixing engineer
Evan Smith – songwriter, synthesizer
Matt Wolach – assistant engineer

Charts

Release history

References

2020 singles
2020 songs
Bleachers (band) songs
Bruce Springsteen songs
RCA Records singles
Song recordings produced by Jack Antonoff
Songs written by Jack Antonoff